The 2021 season is the 100th in the Cruzeiro Esporte Clube's existence.

Along with the Campeonato Brasileiro Série B, the club will also compete in the Campeonato Mineiro and in the Copa do Brasil.

Players

Squad information 
Last updated on 9 October.

Transfers and loans 
Last updated on 24 June.

Transfers in

Loans in

Transfers out

Loans out

Competitions

Overview

Campeonato Mineiro

First stage

Knockout stage

Semi-finals

Campeonato Brasileiro Série B

League table

Results by round

Matches

Copa do Brasil 

The drawn for the first stage was held on 2 March.

First stage

Second stage

Third stage

Squad statistics

Appearances 
Players with no appearances not included in the list.

Goalscorers 
Includes all competitive matches.
.

Assists 
Includes all competitive matches. Not all goals have an assist.
.

Clean sheets 
Includes all competitive matches.
.

Disciplinary record 
Includes all competitive matches.
.

References

External links 
 Cruzeiro Esporte Clube
 Cruzeiro official website (in Portuguese)

Brazilian football clubs 2021 season
2021 Cruzeiro Esporte Clube season